Chinese Taipei Ice Hockey League (abbreviated as CIHL) is a Taiwanese ice hockey league based out of Taipei, Taiwan. Founded in 2004, it is run by  the Chinese Taipei Ice Hockey Federation. The league is divided into two divisions: The Open Division for local players and The International Division for foreigners living in Taiwan. The league plays their games every weekend out of the Taipei Arena.

The International Division also assembles an all-star team, the Taiwan Typhoon, to play in various tournaments around Asia each year.

International Division
This league has two distinct divisions. The International Division has nine teams with most players on the teams being foreigners, Canadians being the dominant nationality represented. The teams in the International Division as of the 2008-09 season are the Rhinos, Bears, Tigers, Wolves, Sharks, Lions, Raptors, Dragons and the Mustangs.

The Open Division
The Open Division is more geared towards Taiwanese players, just learning or being relatively new to the game of hockey.

Results

International division

Open division

External links
Chinese Taipei Ice Hockey League official site   
Chinese Taipei Ice Hockey Federation 

Ice hockey leagues in Asia
Professional ice hockey leagues in Taiwan